Ciliau-Aeron Halt was a small railway station on the Aberayron branch of the Carmarthen to Aberystwyth Line in the Welsh county of Ceredigion serving the hamlet of Ciliau Aeron and the nearby estate of Tyglyn. Opened by the Lampeter, Aberayron and New Quay Light Railway, the branch to Aberayron diverged from the through line at Lampeter.

History
The branch was incorporated into the Great Western Railway during the Grouping of 1923, passing on to the Western Region of British Railways on nationalisation in 1948. Passenger services were discontinued in 1951, general freight in 1963 and milk traffic from near Felin Fach ceased in 1973.

In 1957 photographs show that the brick and stone built platform had a crossing keeper's hut, lighting, a corrugated iron shelter and an old railway wagon as a store. A passing loop lay just short of the platform in the direction of Felin Fach.

Notes

References

  
Great Western Railway Journal Vol 2 No 16 (Autumn 1995)

External links
 Ciliau-Aeron Halt

Former Great Western Railway stations
Disused railway stations in Ceredigion
Railway stations in Great Britain opened in 1911
Railway stations in Great Britain closed in 1951
1911 establishments in Wales
1963 disestablishments in Wales